Millennium Shock  is a BBC Books original novel written by Justin Richards and based on the long-running British science fiction television series Doctor Who. It features the Fourth Doctor and Harry, and is a sequel to Richards' Virgin Missing Adventures novel System Shock.

Premise
In 1999, the Doctor and Harry deal with a plot by the Voracianshybrids of alien reptiles and malevolent office equipmentto take advantage of the Y2K problem to conquer the Earth.

External links

1999 British novels
1999 science fiction novels
Past Doctor Adventures
Fourth Doctor novels
Novels by Justin Richards
New Year novels
Fiction set in 1999
Fiction set in 2000
Turn of the third millennium